Hailing District is one of three districts of Taizhou, Jiangsu province, China.

Administrative divisions
In the present, Hailing District has 11 subdistricts and 3 towns.
11 subdistricts

3 towns
 Jiulong
 Gangyang
 Suchen

References
www.xzqh.org

External links 

County-level divisions of Jiangsu
Taizhou, Jiangsu